Bobby Dickson (born 17 May 1955 in Glasgow) is a Scottish retired football player.

Dickson began his career with Queen's Park, and spent 10 years at Hampden, before joining Glasgow neighbours Clyde in 1983. He spent four years with the Shawfield side, making over 100 appearances. He had short spells with Stenhousemuir and then Queen of the South in the era of George Cloy before retiring in 1988. He is now a technical teacher at Clydebank High School.

External links

Living people
1955 births
Scottish footballers
Queen's Park F.C. players
Clyde F.C. players
Stenhousemuir F.C. players
Queen of the South F.C. players
Association football defenders
Kilwinning Rangers F.C. managers
Scottish Junior Football Association managers